Van Cleave is a surname. Notable people with the surname include:

Aaron Van Cleave (born 1987) U.S./Canadian pair skater
A. R. VanCleave (1889-1987) American football coach
Ira Van Cleave, American football coach
Nathan Van Cleave (1910-1970), American composer and orchestrator known as Van Cleave
Ryan G. Van Cleave (born 1972), American author and teacher
William Van Cleave, former advisor to President Ronald Reagan

See also
Vancleave, Mississippi, United States, a census-designated place
Cleve (surname), includes Van Cleve
Van Cleef, a surname

Surnames of Dutch origin